The Antelope Valley Limestone is a limestone geologic formation of the Pogonip Group in southern Nevada.

It is found in the Antelope Valley region of Eureka County and Nye County.

It preserves fossils dating back to the Whiterock Stage of the Ordovician period.

See also

 List of fossiliferous stratigraphic units in Nevada
 Paleontology in Nevada

References

 

Ordovician geology of Nevada
Limestone formations of the United States
Geography of Eureka County, Nevada
Geography of Nye County, Nevada
Ordovician System of North America
Geologic formations of Nevada
Ordovician southern paleotropical deposits